Werpeloh is a municipality in the Emsland district, in Lower Saxony, Germany.

References

Emsland